Lommel SK is a Belgian association football club based in the city of Lommel, Limburg, that competes in the Challenger Pro League.

History
The roots of the club date back to the 1920s when the club Vlug & Vrij Overpelt-Usines (Fast & Free Overpelt-Factories) was founded, registering as an official club with the Royal Belgian Football Association in 1927 to receive matricule 1064. The club dissolved in 1933 only to be re-established in 1937 as Vlug & Vrij Overpelt (Fast & Free Overpelt) with matricule 2554 and played at stadium De Leukens in Overpelt. It was commonly known as Overpelt Fabriek (Overpelt Factory), named after the Overpelt district in which the zinc factory was situated and was a club for the local factory workers.

In 1954, the club reached the national football levels, that time at the fourth level of the Belgian football pyramid, and continued to the Belgian Third Division in 1957. Near the end of the 1950s, the name was changed again, now to Vlug en Vrij Overpelt-Fabriek (Fast and Free Overpelt-Factory).

In 1982, the club was promoted to the Belgian Second Division where it remained for three seasons before being relegated again and starting an up and down movement between the second and fourth divisions. In 1987 the club obtained the royal designation, thus changing the name in 1988 to Koninklijke Vlug en Vrij Overpelt-Fabriek (Royal Fast and Free Overpelt-Factory). Midway the 1990s the club played three more seasons in the second division but promotion to the highest level would never be obtained.
In 2003 neighbours K.F.C. Lommel S.K. dissolved following bankruptcy. Lommel had been founded in 1932 and its biggest achievements included playing the 2001 Belgian Cup Final and playing in both the 1997 and 1998 UEFA Intertoto Cup. Overpelt-Fabriek and Lommel merged into K.V.S.K. United Overpelt-Lommel, often referred to as KVSK United, with KVSK an abbreviation standing for Koninklijke Voetbalvereniging en Sportkring (Royal Footballassociation and Sportscircle). It continued with the matricule 2554 of Overpelt-Fabriek but moved from De Leukens to the Soevereinstadion in Lommel. The club colours became a combination of those of Lommel (green & white) and Overpelt-Fabriek (red & blue). The new club started the 2003–04 season in the third division and only narrowly missed out on promotion. The following season the team became champions undefeated throughout the whole season (30 matches) and was promoted to the second division. During the 2005–06 season the team came close to promotion to the highest level as it led the table before the last match but lost away to Oud-Heverlee Leuven and saw the title and promotion move to Mons. The following promotion playoffs were lost to Lierse.

In 2010, the club merged with third division team KFC Racing Mol-Wezel and changed its name to Lommel United and started two very successful seasons, ending second in both 2009–10 and 2010–11. This however was a turning point, as almost all starting players decided to leave the club after those two seasons, forcing Lommel United to rebuild the team with many youngsters. A highlight was the 2014–15 season in which Lommel United again finished second.  After that, the team only narrowly managed to obtain a place in the new second-level league called Belgian First Division B, but during the 2016–17 season the team started with only 3 wins out of 28 matches and despite a strong finish, the team was relegated to the Belgian First Amateur Division, thereby losing its professional status. Following that season, the team changed its name to Lommel SK.

In May 2020, it was announced that City Football Group, the parent company of Manchester City, had purchased Lommel SK, making it the ninth club to join their stable.

Current squad

Out on loan

Coaching staff

References

External links
Official website
Lommel S.K. at City Football Group

 
Football clubs in Belgium
Association football clubs established in 2003
2003 establishments in Belgium
Lommel
Sport in Limburg (Belgium)